Jamie Meikle (born c. 1967) is a Canadian-born Welsh curler.

Teams

Personal life
Jamie Meikle is from family of curlers: his father Hugh was a curler and coach, founder of Welsh Curling Association; his mother Elizabeth is also a curler and coach; his older brother Adrian is Jamie's longtime teammate and skip.

References

External links

Living people
Welsh male curlers
1960s births
Curlers from Toronto
Canadian emigrants to Wales